Gusta Guzarishah (born 29 April 1976 in Singapore) is a former Singaporean footballer.

References

Singaporean footballers
Living people
1976 births
Association football midfielders
Association football wingers
Association football forwards
Singapore international footballers